Viktor Vladimirovich Gerashchenko (born 21 December 1937 Leningrad, Soviet Union), nicknamed Gerakl (the Russian version of Heracles, or sometimes of debacle), was the chairman of the Soviet State bank during much of the Perestroika and post-Perestroika periods.

Biography
Viktor Gerashchenko was born in Leningrad on 21 December 1937. His father was a leading Soviet banker who ran the Financial Department of the Foreign Office in the 1940s before ending his career as deputy chairman of the State Bank. Due to his father's connections, Viktor made a brilliant career in the Soviet banking system. At the age of 28 he became director of the first Soviet bank abroad, Moscow Narodny Bank, based in London.

In 1982 Gerashcheko moved to work in the Vneshtorgbank, responsible for the Soviet foreign trade. Seven years later he was appointed chairman of the Board of the USSR State Bank. In 1991, Gerashchenko became the last chairman of the State Bank of the USSR. For three years, which proved to be some of the most difficult for the Russian national economics, he steered the nascent banking system as chairman of the Bank of Russia.

For approximately seven years during the 1990s, the Kremlin's obshchak («общак») or black cash was stored in the vaults of Vnesheconombank (VEB) because Gerashchenko stated that in 1992 VEB became an agency for the return of the state debt of the USSR due to a decree by the Supreme Soviet: "Vnesheconombank does not have a central banking license. It does not need it, since it does not conduct any commercial operations." He also added, "Due to the lack of a license, this is the only Russian bank that the Central Bank does not check – it does not have the right."

His activities as Central Bank chair were controversial: for example, he was accused of illegally supplying money to the anti-reform forces in the Supreme Soviet during the 1993 Russian Constitutional Crisis. Gerashchenko has also been accused of being largely responsible for the Russian "Black Tuesday" of October 1994, when the Russian ruble crashed 24 percent in one day. Former Harvard economist Jeffrey Sachs in 1995 called Gerashchenko "the worst central banker in the world."

Gerashchenko resigned in 1994, but returned to the office following the 1998 Russian financial crisis. Under his leadership, the economy of Russia rapidly recovered after the excruciating default. Gerashchenko made frequent TV appearances and became quite popular for his sardonic, dry sense of humor.

In March 2002 Gerashchenko resigned again, citing his advanced age, and accepted the post of chairman of the board in the notorious oil company Yukos. He then joined the Rodina party as a co-chairman and made it to the State Duma as their representative.

Presidential candidacies

2004
Gerashchenko ran in the 2004 Russian presidential election.

He was originally believed to have been acting as a back-up candidate to Rodina leader Sergey Glazyev, in case something were to prevent Glazyev from running. However, a divide between Glazyev and Geraschchenko became apparent when Rodina nominated Geraschchenko for president instead of Glazyev.

Geraschenko was ultimately refused registration by the Central Election Commission due to a technicality. The Supreme Court upheld his disqualification.

2008
Four years later he considered running as an opposition candidate in the 2008 Russian Presidential election.

Honours and awards
 Order "For Merit to the Fatherland", 3rd class
Order "For Merit to the Fatherland", 4th class
 Order of Honour
 Order of the Red Banner of Labour
 Order of Friendship of Peoples
 Medal "For Labour Valour"
 Jubilee Medal "In Commemoration of the 100th Anniversary of the Birth of Vladimir Ilyich Lenin"
 Jubilee Medal "300 Years of the Russian Navy"
 Medal "In Commemoration of the 850th Anniversary of Moscow"

References

1937 births
Living people
Russian economists
Russian bankers
Chairmen of the Board of Gosbank
Fourth convocation members of the State Duma (Russian Federation)
Businesspeople from Saint Petersburg
Russian people of Belarusian descent
Yukos
Recipients of the Order "For Merit to the Fatherland", 3rd class
Recipients of the Order "For Merit to the Fatherland", 4th class
Recipients of the Order of Friendship of Peoples
Recipients of the Order of Honour (Russia)
Recipients of the Order of the Red Banner of Labour
Academic staff of the Higher School of Economics
Presidents of the Central Bank of Russia
Soviet expatriates in the United Kingdom